To All My Friends On Shore is a 1972 television film drama starring Bill Cosby, and co-starring Gloria Foster. Cosby not only starred in the film, but produced it and worked on the film's music.

Plot
Blue (Cosby) works as a skycap for an airport. At the same time he works a second job as a junk scavenger. His wife Serena (Foster) works as a maid and is going to school trying to become a nurse. Blue is busy working trying to save money to buy his family a house so they can leave the projects. His young son, Vandy (Hines), resents him because he won't let him have any fun like his friends. It is eventually discovered that Vandy has sickle cell anemia. It is then that Blue realizes what he should spend his time on - being with his family.

Cast
Bill Cosby....Blue
Gloria Foster....Serena Blue
Dennis Hines....Evander "Vandy" Blue Jr.

Production
This was one of a string of film/TV productions Bill Cosby did in the 1970s. After he did The Bill Cosby Show (1969-1971), Cosby did other works. He did this film plus Man and Boy and Hickey & Boggs, the latter of which paired him with his I Spy co star Robert Culp. In addition he produced the Saturday morning series Fat Albert and the Cosby Kids which ran on CBS until the 1980s. Although Cosby did drama, he stayed with it in brief and concentrated on comedy; during this time, he worked with Gloria Foster, who appeared in other Cosby shows and films. As the 1970s closed, Cosby stayed with Fat Albert and worked on variety shows for Prime Time that ultimately bombed and were cancelled, including Cos.

References

External links

To All My Friends on Shore at URBTPlus

1972 drama films
American drama television films
1970s American films
1972 television films